2010 Tokyo Verdy season

Competitions

Player statistics

Other pages
 J. League official site

Tokyo Verdy
Tokyo Verdy seasons